JoJo Earle (born April 5, 2003) is an American football wide receiver for the TCU Horned Frogs. He previously played for the Alabama Crimson Tide.

Early life and high school
Earle grew up in Aledo, Texas and attended Aledo High School. He caught 84 passes for 1,601 yards and 15 touchdowns and also rushed for 429 yards and 11 touchdowns as a junior. Earle won the Landry Award as a senior after catching 61 passes for 1,007 yards and eight touchdowns and also rushing 87 times for 591 yards and 12 touchdowns. Earle was rated a four-star recruit and initially committed to play college football at LSU during his junior year. He later flipped his commitment to Alabama.

College career

Alabama 
Earle caught 12 passes for 148 yards during his freshman season at Alabama. He suffered a broken foot during summer training camp entering his sophomore year. Earle returned after missing the first four games of the season. He ultimately played in eight games and had 12 receptions for 155 yards and two touchdowns. Following the end of the season, Earle entered the NCAA transfer portal.

TCU 
Earle ultimately transferred to Texas Christian University.

References

External links
Alabama Crimson Tide bio

Living people
Players of American football from Texas
American football wide receivers
Alabama Crimson Tide football players
TCU Horned Frogs football players
Year of birth missing (living people)